Alvin "Pooh" Williamson (born September 5, 1973) is a former college basketball player who is currently an assistant coach at the University of Oklahoma.  Williamson was interim head coach at the University of Tulsa and was an assistant coach at Texas Tech University.

Williamson played for the Golden Hurricane from 1991 to 1995, becoming one of their best guards.  In 2001, he returned to become an assistant coach before becoming Tulsa's head coach following John Phillips' resignation in December 2004.  Williamson finished the 2004–2005 season as Tulsa's head coach before being replaced by Doug Wojcik.

Williamson coached at Miami as an assistant during the 2018–19 season. In June 2019, he was hired to Lon Kruger's staff at Oklahoma.

Head coaching record

References

Wichita State Biography

1973 births
Living people
American men's basketball coaches
American men's basketball players
Basketball coaches from Oklahoma
Basketball players from Oklahoma
Illinois State Redbirds men's basketball coaches
Oklahoma City Cavalry players
SMU Mustangs men's basketball coaches
TCU Horned Frogs men's basketball coaches
Texas A&M Aggies men's basketball coaches
Texas Tech Red Raiders basketball coaches
Tulane Green Wave men's basketball coaches
Tulsa Golden Hurricane men's basketball coaches
Tulsa Golden Hurricane men's basketball players
Washington State Cougars men's basketball coaches
Wichita State Shockers men's basketball coaches
Point guards